Nercesse (last name unknown), also spelled Narcis, was a Lebanese footballer who played as an forward.

Nercesse played for DPHB, Homenetmen, Antranik, and Sagesse at club level. He took part in Lebanon's first international match against Mandatory Palestine in 1940.

Honours 
DPHB
 Lebanese Premier League: 1940–41
 Lebanese FA Cup runner-up: 1939–40

References

External links
 

Year of birth missing
Year of death missing
Lebanese people of Armenian descent
Ethnic Armenian sportspeople
Association football forwards
Lebanese footballers
AS DPHB players
Homenetmen Beirut footballers
Antranik Youth Association footballers
Sagesse SC footballers
Lebanese Premier League players
Lebanon international footballers
Unidentified people